Musikförläggarnas pris is an annual award given to Swedish songwriters, producers and lyricists. The award was created in 2003 by the Musikförläggarna music organisation in Sweden and meants to highlight Swedish music and its creators. The award ceremony is held every year at Berns Salonger in Stockholm and the prizes are made by designer Bertil Vallien.

Categories 
Composer of the Year
International Success of the Year
Breakthrough of the Year
Song of the Year
Art Music Award of the Year - Large Ensemble/Opera
Art Music Award of the Year - Small Ensemble/Chamber Music
Scholarship Award
Special Award of the Year
Most Played Song of the Year

References

Musikförläggarnas pris